Gjeravica or Đeravica is the second-highest mountain peak in the Accursed Mountains mountain range and the Dinaric Alps chain, after Maja Jezercë. It is the second-highest mountain in Kosovo. Gjeravica is in the western part of Kosovo, in the municipality of Junik. Before the 20th century, Gjeravica used to be called Kaluđerovica (Kaluđer means monk in Serbian), because of the Serbian Orthodox Monastery of Peć at the gateway to the mountains.

Features
Gjeravica is somewhat different from the rest of the Accursed mountains in its lack of the stony, limestone texture the other mountains in Accursed Mountains have. Many large and small glacial lakes can be found near the summit. The largest of the lakes is Gjeravica Lake, which is just under the summit and is the origin of the Erenik river.

Gjeravica and the Accursed mountains are mostly known for the growth of chestnuts. There are also wild strawberries growing in Gjeravica during the summer.

Geography

Nearby settlements

Deçan
Junik
Peja
Belaje
Krsi i Cenit
Krsi i Zi

Nearby peaks

 Kumulore
 Tropojske Pločice
 Guri i Gjate
 Maja e Ram Arućit
 Ljogi i Prels

Cliffs

 Biga Tamas
 Krsi i Cenit
 Kumulore
 Krsi i Zi
 Guri i Mal
 Gurt e Ljove
 Brehov
 Minarja

Nearby springs

 Kroni Tedel
 Kroni Gusija
 Kroni i Lizit
 Kroni i Nuses
 Gura e Hasanags
 Kroni i Metes
 Gura e Mir
 Kroni i Rasave
 Kroni i Smajlit
 Gura i Cursis
 Gura Hods
 Kroni i Mir

Notes

References

External links

Summitpost, Đeravica

Peakbagger, Đeravica

Mountains of Kosovo
Accursed Mountains
Two-thousanders of Kosovo
Highest points of countries